François Marie Charles Fourier (7 April 1772 – 10 October 1837) was a French philosopher, an influential early socialist thinker and one of the founders of utopian socialism. Some of Fourier's social and moral views, held to be radical in his lifetime, have become mainstream thinking in modern society. For instance, Fourier is credited with having originated the word feminism in 1837.

Fourier's social views and proposals inspired a whole movement of intentional communities. Among them in the United States were the community of Utopia, Ohio; La Reunion near present-day Dallas, Texas; Lake Zurich, Illinois; the North American Phalanx in Red Bank, New Jersey; Brook Farm in West Roxbury, Massachusetts; the Community Place and Sodus Bay Phalanx in New York State; Silkville, Kansas, and several others. Fourier later inspired a diverse array of revolutionary thinkers and writers.

Life
Fourier was born in Besançon, France on 7 April 1772. The son of a small businessman, Fourier was more interested in architecture than in his father's trade. He wanted to become an engineer, but the local military engineering school accepted only sons of noblemen. Fourier later said he was grateful that he did not pursue engineering, because it would have consumed too much of his time and taken away from his true desire to help humanity.

When his father died in 1781, Fourier received two-fifths of his father's estate, valued at more than 200,000 francs. This inheritance enabled Fourier to travel throughout Europe at his leisure. In 1791 he moved from Besançon to Lyon, where he was employed by the merchant M. Bousquet. Fourier's travels also brought him to Paris, where he worked as the head of the Office of Statistics for a few months. From 1791 to 1816 Fourier was employed in Paris, Rouen, Lyon, Marseille, and Bordeaux. As a traveling salesman and correspondence clerk, his research and thought was time-limited: he complained of "serving the knavery of merchants" and the stupefaction of "deceitful and degrading duties." 

He began writing. His first book was published in 1808, but it only sold a few copies. Surprisingly, after six years, the book fell into the hands of Monsieur Just Muiron who eventually became Fourier's patron. Fourier produced most of his writings between 1816 and 1821. In 1822, he tried to sell his books again but with no success.

Fourier died in Paris in 1837.

Ideas
Fourier declared that concern and cooperation were the secrets of social success. He believed that a society that cooperated would see an immense improvement in their productivity levels. Workers would be recompensed for their labors according to their contribution. Fourier saw such cooperation occurring in communities he called "phalanxes," based upon structures called Phalanstères or "grand hotels". These buildings were four-level apartment complexes where the richest had the uppermost apartments and the poorest had a ground-floor residence. Wealth was determined by one's job; jobs were assigned based on the interests and desires of the individual. There were incentives: jobs people might not enjoy doing would receive higher pay. Fourier considered trade, which he associated with Jews, to be the "source of all evil" and advocated that Jews be forced to perform farm work in the phalansteries. By the end of his life, Fourier advocated the return of Jews to Palestine with the assistance of the Rothschilds. John K. Roth and Richard L. Rubenstein have seen Fourier as motivated by economic and religious antisemitism, rather than the racial antisemitism that would emerge later in the century.

Attack on civilization
Fourier characterized poverty (not inequality) as the principal cause of disorder in society, and he proposed to eradicate it by sufficiently high wages and by a "decent minimum" for those who were not able to work. Fourier used the word civilization in a negative sense and as such "Fourier's contempt for the respectable thinkers and ideologies of his age was so intense that he always used the terms philosopher and civilization in a pejorative sense. In his lexicon civilization was a depraved order, a synonym for perfidy and constraint ... Fourier's attack on civilization had qualities not to be found in the writing of any other social critic of his time."

Work and liberated passions
For Herbert Marcuse "The idea of libidinal work relations in a developed industrial society finds little support in the tradition of thought, and where such
support is forthcoming it seems of a dangerous nature. The transformation of labor into pleasure is the central idea in Fourier's giant
socialist utopia."

He believed that there were twelve common passions which resulted in 810 types of character, so the ideal phalanx would have exactly 1620 people. One day there would be six million of these, loosely ruled by a world "omniarch", or (later) a World Congress of Phalanxes. He had a concern for the sexually rejected; jilted suitors would be led away by a corps of fairies who would soon cure them of their lovesickness, and visitors could consult the card-index of personality types for suitable partners for casual sex. He also defended homosexuality as a personal preference for some people. Anarchist Hakim Bey describes Fourier's ideas as follows: 
In Fourier's system of Harmony all creative activity including industry, craft, agriculture, etc. will arise from liberated passion—this is the famous theory of "attractive labor." Fourier sexualizes work itself—the life of the Phalanstery is a continual orgy of intense feeling, intellection, & activity, a society of lovers & wild enthusiasts.

Women's rights
Fourier was also a supporter of women's rights. Fourier believed that all important jobs should be open to women on the basis of skill and aptitude rather than closed on account of gender. He spoke of women as individuals, not as half the human couple. Fourier saw that "traditional" marriage could potentially hurt woman's rights as human beings and thus never married. Writing before the advent of the term 'homosexuality', Fourier held that both men and women have a wide range of sexual needs and preferences which may change throughout their lives, including same-sex sexuality and androgénité. He argued that all sexual expressions should be enjoyed as long as people are not abused, and that "affirming one's difference" can actually enhance social integration.

Fourier's concern was to liberate every human individual, man, woman, and child, in two senses: education and the liberation of human passion.

Children and education
On education, Fourier felt that "civilized" parents and teachers saw children as little idlers. Fourier felt that this way of thinking was wrong. He felt that children as early as age two and three were very industrious. He listed the dominant tastes in all children to include, but not limited to:

Rummaging or inclination to handle everything, examine everything, look through everything, to constantly change occupations;
Industrial commotion, taste for noisy occupations;
Aping or imitative mania.
Industrial miniature, a taste for miniature workshops.
Progressive attraction of the weak toward the strong.

Fourier was deeply disturbed by the disorder of his time and wanted to stabilize the course of events which surrounded him. Fourier saw his fellow human beings living in a world full of strife, chaos, and disorder.

Fourier is best remembered for his writings on a new world order based on unity of action and harmonious collaboration. He is also known for certain Utopian pronouncements, such as that the seas would lose their salinity and turn to lemonade, and a coincidental view of climate change, that the North Pole would be milder than the Mediterranean in a future phase of Perfect Harmony.

Influence 

The influence of Fourier's ideas in French politics was carried forward into the 1848 Revolution and the Paris Commune by followers such as Victor Considerant.

Numerous references to Fourierism appear in Dostoevsky's political novel Demons first published in 1872.
Fourier's ideas also took root in America, with his followers starting phalanxes throughout the country, including one of the most famous, Utopia, Ohio.
Peter Kropotkin, in the preface to his book The Conquest of Bread, considered Fourier to be the founder of the libertarian branch of socialist thought, as opposed to the authoritarian socialist ideas of Babeuf and Buonarroti.
In the mid-20th century, Fourier's influence began to rise again among writers reappraising socialist ideas outside the Marxist mainstream. After the Surrealists had broken with the French Communist Party, André Breton returned to Fourier, writing Ode à Charles Fourier in 1947.
Walter Benjamin considered Fourier crucial enough to devote an entire "konvolut" of his massive, projected book on the Paris arcades, the Passagenwerk, to Fourier's thought and influence. He writes: "To have instituted play as the canon of a labor no longer rooted in exploitation is one of the great merits of Fourier", and notes that "Only in the summery middle of the nineteenth century, only under its sun, can one conceive of Fourier's fantasy materialized."
Herbert Marcuse in his influential work Eros and Civilization praised Fourier saying that "Fourier comes closer than any other utopian socialist to elucidating the dependence of freedom on non-repressive sublimation."
In 1969, Raoul Vaneigem quoted and adapted Fourier's Avis aux civilisés relativement à la prochaine métamorphose sociale in his text Avis aux civilisés relativement à l'autogestion généralisée.

Fourier's work has significantly influenced the writings of Gustav Wyneken, Guy Davenport (in his work of fiction Apples and Pears), Peter Lamborn Wilson, and Paul Goodman.
In Whit Stillman's film Metropolitan, the idealistic Tom Townsend describes himself as a Fourierist, and debates the success of social experiment Brook Farm with another of the characters. Bidding him goodnight, Sally Fowler says, "Good luck with your furrierism." 
David Harvey, in the appendix to his book Spaces of Hope, offers a personal utopian vision of the future in cities citing Fourier's ideas.
Libertarian socialist and environmentalist thinker Murray Bookchin wrote that "The Greek ideal of the rounded citizen in a rounded environment — one that reappeared in Charles Fourier’s utopian works — was long cherished by the anarchists and socialists of the last century...The opportunity of the individual to devote his or her productive activity to many different tasks over an attenuated work week (or in Fourier’s ideal society, over a given day) was seen as a vital factor in overcoming the division between manual and intellectual activity, in transcending status differences that this major division of work created, and in enhancing the wealth of experiences that came with a free movement from industry through crafts to food cultivation."
Nathaniel Hawthorne in Chapter 7 of his novel The Blithedale Romance gently mocks Fourier, saying 
Writers of the post-left anarchy tendency have praised the writings of Fourier. Bob Black in his work The Abolition of Work advocates Fourier's idea of attractive work as a solution to his criticisms of work conditions in contemporary society. Hakim Bey manifested that Fourier "lived at the same time as De Sade & (William) Blake, & deserves to be remembered as their equal or even superior. Those other two apostles of freedom & desire had no political disciples, but in the middle of the 19th century literally hundreds of communes (phalansteries) were founded on fourierist principles".

In popular culture 
In the movie Metropolitan, one of the main characters, Tom Townsend, mentions "I favor the socialist model developed by the 19th-century French social critic Charles Fourier".

Fourier's works
Fourier, Charles. Théorie des quatre mouvements et des destinées générales (Theory of the four movements and the general destinies), appeared anonymously in Lyon in 1808.
Fourier, Charles. Le Nouveau Monde amoureux. Written 1816–18, not published widely until 1967.
 Fourier, Ch. Œuvres complètes de Ch. Fourier. 6 tomes. Paris: Librairie Sociétaire, 1841-1848.
 Fourier, Charles. La Fausse Industrie Morcelée, Répugnante, Mensongère, et L'Antidote, L'Industrie Naturelle, Combinée, Attrayante, Vérdique, donnant quadruple produit (False Industry, Fragmented, Repugnant, Lying and the Antidote, Natural Industry, Combined, Attractive, True, giving four times the product), Paris: Bossange. 1835.
 Fourier, Charles. Oeuvres complètes de Charles Fourier. 12 vols. Paris: Anthropos, 1966–1968.
Jones, Gareth Stedman, and Ian Patterson, eds. Fourier: The Theory of the Four Movements. Cambridge Texts in the History of Political Thought. Cambridge: Cambridge UP, 1996.
Fourier, Charles. Design for Utopia: Selected Writings. Studies in the Libertarian and Utopian Tradition. New York: Schocken, 1971. 
Poster, Mark, ed. Harmonian Man: Selected Writings of Charles Fourier. Garden City: Doubleday. 1971.
Beecher, Jonathan and Richard Bienvenu, eds. The Utopian Vision of Charles Fourier: Selected Texts on Work, Love, and Passionate Attraction. Boston: Beacon Press, 1971.
Wilson, Peter Lamborn, Escape from the Nineteenth Century and Other Essays. Brooklyn: Autonomedia, 1998.

See also

Alphadelphia Association
Alphonse Toussenel, a disciple of Fourier
American Union of Associationists
Brook Farm
Decent work
List of Fourierist Associations in the United States
Society of the Friends of Truth

References

Further reading

On Fourier and his works

 pp. 213–255

 p. 59
 Lloyd-Jones, I D."Charles Fourier, The Realistic Visionary " History Today 12#1 (1962): pp198–205.

 « Portrait : Charles Fourier (1772-1837) ». La nouvelle lettre, n°1070 (12 mars 2011): 8.

On Fourierism and his posthumous influence
Barthes, Roland Sade Fourier Loyola. Paris: Seuil, 1971.
 
Brock, William H. Phalanx on a Hill: Responses to Fourierism in the Transcendentalist Circle. Diss., Loyola U Chicago, 1996.

Desroche, Henri. La Société festive. Du fouriérisme écrit au fouriérismes pratiqués. Paris: Seuil, 1975.
Engels, Frederick. Anti-Dühring. 25:1-309. Marx, Karl, and Frederick Engels. Karl Marx, Frederick Engels: Collected Works [MECW]. 46 vols. to date. Moscow: Progress, 1975.

Jameson, Fredric. "Fourier; or; Ontology and Utopia" at

External links

 
 
 "Charles Fourier Prefigures Our Total Refusal" by Don LaCoss
  Selections from the Works of Fourier a 1901 collection
 Charles Fourier Archive at marxists.org
 

1772 births
1837 deaths
18th-century French writers
18th-century philosophers
19th-century French non-fiction writers
19th-century philosophers
Burials at Montmartre Cemetery
European democratic socialists
Feminist philosophers
Free love advocates
French ethicists
French feminists
French humanists
French humanitarians
French male non-fiction writers
French male writers
French philosophers
French socialists
Fourierists
Libertarian socialists
Male feminists
Writers from Besançon
Philosophers of culture
Philosophers of economics
Philosophers of education
Philosophers of history
Philosophers of love
Philosophers of sexuality
Political philosophers
Sex-positive feminists
French social commentators
Social philosophers
Socialist economists
French socialist feminists
Theorists on Western civilization
Utopian socialists
18th-century socialists